Kirinia epaminondas is a Palaearctic butterfly of the family Nymphalidae. It was described by Otto Staudinger in 1887.

Distribution
Kirinia epaminondas occurs in the Amur Oblast and Primorsky Krai of the Russian Far East, as well as in East China, Korea and Japan.

Habitat and host plants
The habitat of K. epaminondas consists of dry, thin forests and shrubby habitats. Host plants include Brachypodium spp., Poa ochotensis and Poa angustifolia.

Behaviour
Butterflies are on wing in July and August.

References

Kirinia
Butterflies of Asia
Butterflies described in 1887
Taxa named by Otto Staudinger